Two Medicine Fight Site is a site on the National Register of Historic Places located roughly 25 miles southeast of Browning, Montana, within the eastern boundary of the Blackfeet Nation. The location was the site of the only violent encounter of the Lewis and Clark Expedition, on July 27, 1806.

It was added to the National Register on October 6, 1970.

See also 
 Camp Disappointment

References

Conflict sites on the National Register of Historic Places in Montana
Geography of Pondera County, Montana
1806 in Montana
National Register of Historic Places in Pondera County, Montana
Lewis and Clark Expedition
Blackfeet Nation